The instinctive drowning response is an instinctive reaction that occurs in humans, particularly in non-swimmers, when close to drowning. It is focused on attempting to keep the mouth above water to the exclusion of useful effort to attract help or self rescue, and is often not recognized by onlookers. The reaction is characterized by lateral arm movements, a vertical posture, tilting back the head, and inability to keep the mouth above the water or talk. The suppression of rational behavior by panic can also endanger swimmers attempting to rescue the victim.

Description 
While distress and panic may sometimes take place beforehand, drowning itself is quick and often silent. A person close to the point of drowning is unable to keep their mouth above water long enough to breathe properly and is unable to shout. Lacking air, their body cannot perform the voluntary efforts involved in waving or seeking attention. Involuntary actions operated by the autonomic nervous system involve lateral flapping or paddling with the arms to press them down into the water in the effort to raise the mouth long enough to breathe, and tilting the head back. As an instinctive reaction, this is not consciously mediated nor under conscious control.

The lack of leg movement, upright position, inability to talk or keep the mouth consistently above water, and (upon attempting to reach the victim) the absence of expected rescue-directed actions, are evidence of the condition.

Timing 
The instinct takes place for typically no longer than the final 20–60 seconds during drowning and before sinking underwater. In comparison, a person who can still shout and keep their mouth constantly above water may be in distress, but is not in immediate danger of drowning compared to a person unable to do so.

Recognizing drowning 
To an untrained observer, it may not be obvious that a drowning person is in distress.  The victim may appear to be swimming safely, while actually within 20–60 seconds of sinking under the surface.
They extend their arms laterally and press down on the water's surface in order to lift their mouth out of the water.

When their mouth is above the water, they quickly exhale and inhale instead of calling for help. Because of their arm movements and focus on lifting their mouth out of the water, they cannot wave, kick their feet, swim to a rescuer, or grasp a rope or other rescue equipment. They may be misunderstood as "playing in the water" by those unfamiliar with drowning, and other swimmers just meters away may not realize that an emergency is occurring.

Lifeguards and other persons trained in rescue learn to recognize a drowning person by watching for these instinctive actions.

Danger to rescuer

In emergency situations in which lifeguards or other trained personnel are not present, it is advisable to reach for the victim from land with your hand or a long stick, row to them in a boat, or throw them a flotation device, but not to enter the water (often pithily summarised as "Reach or throw, don't go.") While the instinctive reaction to drowning is taking place, the victim will latch onto any nearby solid objects in attempts to get air, which can result in the drowning of a would-be rescuer as well as (or instead of) the original victim. This "aquatic victim-instead-of-rescuer scenario" is common and killed 103 would-be rescuers in Australia between 1992 and 2010, and another 81 people in New Zealand between 1980 and 2012. A study of drownings in Turkey found 88 cases in which 114 would-be rescuers drowned during their attempts to rescue a primary drowning victim.

Research and discovery 
The common drowning behaviors were identified by Frank Pia, based upon study of film footage of actual and near-drownings, and documented in his 1971 instructional film, On Drowning, and a 1974 paper, Observations on the drowning of nonswimmers.

At the time, it was commonly believed that drowning involved agitated behaviors, although Pia cites an earlier (unspecified) 1966 paper as likewise observing that this was not necessarily the case.

References

External links 
 Drowning Signs Aren't Like the Movies, WIVBTV.

Drowning
Lifesaving
Medical emergencies
Diving medicine
Reflexes